The  is a railway line in Japan operated by the private railway operator Sanyo Electric Railway. It stretches from Kobe west to Himeji via Akashi, Kakogawa and other municipalities in Hyōgo Prefecture. The line runs parallel to West Japan Railway Company (JR West) JR Kobe Line, with closest sections between Sanyo Suma and Sanyo Akashi stations, and competes with the JR line for its entire stretch. Despite the name, no part of the line is located in the San’yō region.

Operation
 is nominal as the start of the line, thus all trains of Sanyo start or end beyond, in Kobe Rapid Railway, or further Hanshin stations, namely  stations on Hankyū's Kobe Main Line and on Hanshin's Main Line for Locals,  terminal of Hanshin in Osaka.

In the Sanyo Main Line, all Hanshin trains stop all stations on their way, though in Hanshin's Main Line some are operated as Locals and some as Limited Express.

Services

All day operation 

Hankyu  or Hanshin Sannomiya or  - Sanyo Himeji, makes every stop on the Sanyo Railway Main Line and the Kobe Kosoku Line.

Hanshin-Umeda - . Jointly operated by Hanshin Electric Railway and Sanyo, this train makes limited stops on both the Hanshin's Main Line and the Sanyo's Main Line. In Hanshin's official route maps the name is shorted to "Limited Express".

In Hanshin's official route maps the name is also shorted to "Limited Express".

Morning and night only 

Mainly operated between Higashi-Futami and Sanyo Himeji, there is a westbound train from Kosoku Kobe for Sanyo Himeji in the early morning.  The same stops as the Hanshin-Sanyo Limited Express (HS) but does not go east beyond Kosoku kobe.

Hanshin Sannomiya - Sanyo Himeji. This service makes more stops than the Hanshin Limited Express.

Stations

 Local trains stop at all stations.
 All stations are located in Hyogo Prefecture.

Legend:

 ● : All trains stop
 ▲ : Some trains stop
 ｜ : All trains pass

History
All subsequent extensions were electrified dual track. The line was extended to Akashi in 1917.

In 1923, the Kobe Electric Railway opened the Akashi to Himeji section, and merged with the Hyogo Electric Railway in 1927. The Sanyo Electric Railway was created in 1934.

The line voltage was increased to 1,500 V DC in 1948. In 1968, the Higashi Suma to Hyogo Electric Railway Station section was closed and the line was connected to the Hanshin Main Line, enabling through services to Umeda in Osaka.

Station numbering was introduced on Sanyo Electric Railway lines from 1 April 2014, with Main Line stations numbered SY01 to SY43.

Accidents
On 12 February 2013, at around 15:50, a non-stop 6-car limited express service bound for  collided with the rear end of a truck which was protruding onto a level crossing to the west of Arai Station. The first two cars of the train derailed and slid 170 m before hitting the edge of the station platform and coming to rest. 15 people were injured in the collision, including the train driver and truck driver.

References

Railway lines in Japan
Transport in Kobe
Rail transport in Hyōgo Prefecture
Railway lines opened in 1910